Bangladesh Road Transport Authority (BRTA) is the road transport regulatory agency of Bangladesh.

History 
Bangladesh Road Transport Authority was established under section 2A of the Motor Vehicle Ordinance of 1983 and the subsequent 1987 amendment. It has functioned since January 1988. BRTA is a regulatory body to control, manage and ensure discipline in the road transport sector of Bangladesh, as well as to maintain road safety. It works under the Ministry of Road Transport and Bridges to carry out the purposes set out for it under the Motor Vehicle Ordinance.

The Chairman is the chief executive of BRTA. The chairman is in charge of fulfilling the purposes of BRTA as prescribed by the rules and assigned by the government.
The total number of circles under the purview of BRTA is 62 (57 district circles and five metro circles).

Activities
 Controlling and regulating road transport by executing motor vehicle acts, issuing route permits, and fixing rates and fares of buses and trucks
 Conducting regular activities like: Issuing driving license, fitness certificates, registration certificates and Driving Instructor's licenses
 Registering schools for motoring
 Organizing and conducting workshop seminars for delivering information regarding safe driving and traffic regulations
 Making research and development for developing ideas and methodologies for safe road transport and traffic system

Services
 Vehicle registration
 Fitness & tax token issues
 Route permit issues
 Number plate issues
 Driving license issues

See also
 Bangladesh Road Transport Corporation
 Driving license in Bangladesh
 Vehicle registration plates of Bangladesh

References

External links
 BRTA
 Ministry of Communications, Government of Bangladesh
 Roads & Highway Department,Ministry of Communication 

Road transport in Bangladesh
Road authorities
Government agencies of Bangladesh
Transport authorities in Bangladesh
1987 establishments in Bangladesh